Calcium sulfate (or calcium sulphate) is the inorganic compound with the formula CaSO4 and related hydrates. In the form of γ-anhydrite (the anhydrous form), it is used as a desiccant. One particular hydrate is better known as plaster of Paris, and another occurs naturally as the mineral gypsum.  It has many uses in industry. All forms are white solids that are poorly soluble in water. Calcium sulfate causes permanent hardness in water.

Hydration states and crystallographic structures
The compound exists in three levels of hydration corresponding to different crystallographic structures and to minerals:
  (anhydrite): anhydrous state.  The structure is related to that of zirconium orthosilicate (zircon):  is 8-coordinate,  is tetrahedral, O is 3-coordinate.
  (gypsum and selenite (mineral)): dihydrate.
  (bassanite): hemihydrate, also known as plaster of Paris. Specific hemihydrates are sometimes distinguished: α-hemihydrate and β-hemihydrate.

Uses

The main use of calcium sulfate is to produce plaster of Paris and stucco. These applications exploit the fact that calcium sulfate which has been powdered and calcined forms a moldable paste upon hydration and hardens as crystalline calcium sulfate dihydrate. It is also convenient that calcium sulfate is poorly soluble in water and does not readily dissolve in contact with water after its solidification.

Hydration and dehydration reactions

With judicious heating, gypsum converts to the partially dehydrated mineral called bassanite or plaster of Paris. This material has the formula CaSO4·(nH2O), where  0.5 ≤ n ≤ 0.8. The details of the temperature and time depend on ambient humidity. The heat energy delivered to the gypsum at this time (the heat of hydration) tends to go into driving off water (as water vapor) rather than increasing the temperature of the mineral, which rises slowly until the water is gone, then increases more rapidly. The equation for the partial dehydration is:

 CaSO4 · 2 H2O   →   CaSO4 ·  H2O +  H2O↑

The endothermic property of this reaction is relevant to the performance of drywall, conferring fire resistance to residential and other structures. In a fire, the structure behind a sheet of drywall will remain relatively cool as water is lost from the gypsum, thus preventing (or substantially retarding) damage to the framing (through combustion of wood members or loss of strength of steel at high temperatures) and consequent structural collapse. But at higher temperatures, calcium sulfate will release oxygen and act as an oxidizing agent. This property is used in aluminothermy. In contrast to most minerals, which when rehydrated simply form liquid or semi-liquid pastes, or remain powdery, calcined gypsum has an unusual property: when mixed with water at normal (ambient) temperatures, it quickly reverts chemically to the preferred dihydrate form, while physically "setting" to form a rigid and relatively strong gypsum crystal lattice:

CaSO4 ·  H2O +  H2O    →   CaSO4 · 2 H2O

This reaction is exothermic and is responsible for the ease with which gypsum can be cast into various shapes including sheets (for drywall), sticks (for blackboard chalk), and molds (to immobilize broken bones, or for metal casting). Mixed with polymers, it has been used as a bone repair cement. Small amounts of calcined gypsum are added to earth to create strong structures directly from cast earth, an alternative to adobe (which loses its strength when wet). The conditions of dehydration can be changed to adjust the porosity of the hemihydrate, resulting in the so-called α- and β-hemihydrates (which are more or less chemically identical).

On heating above 250 °C, the completely anhydrous form called β-anhydrite or "natural" anhydrite is formed. Natural anhydrite does not react with water, even over geological timescales, unless very finely ground.

The variable composition of the hemihydrate and γ-anhydrite, and their easy inter-conversion, is due to their nearly identical crystal structures containing "channels" that can accommodate variable amounts of water, or other small molecules such as methanol.

Food industry
The calcium sulfate hydrates are used as a coagulant in products such as tofu.

For the FDA, it is permitted in Cheese and Related Cheese Products; Cereal Flours; Bakery Products; Frozen Desserts; Artificial Sweeteners for Jelly & Preserves; Condiment Vegetables; and Condiment Tomatoes and some candies.

It is known in the E number series as E516, and the UN's FAO knows it as a firming agent, a flour treatment agent, a sequestrant, and a leavening agent.

Dentistry 
Calcium sulfate has a long history of use in dentistry. It has been used in bone regeneration as a graft material and graft binder (or extender) and as a barrier in guided bone tissue regeneration. It is a biocompatible material and is completely resorbed following implantation. It does not evoke a significant host response and creates a calcium-rich milieu in the area of implantation.

Other uses

When sold at the anhydrous state as a desiccant with a color-indicating agent under the name Drierite, it appears blue (anhydrous) or pink (hydrated) due to impregnation with cobalt(II) chloride, which functions as a moisture indicator.

Up to the 1970s, commercial quantities of sulfuric acid were produced in Whitehaven (Cumbria, UK) from anhydrous calcium sulfate. Upon being mixed with shale or marl, and roasted, the sulfate liberates sulfur dioxide gas, a precursor in sulfuric acid production, the reaction also produces calcium silicate, a mineral phase essential in cement clinker production.

 2 CaSO4 + 2 SiO2 → 2 CaSiO3 + 2 SO2 + O2  

The plant made sulfuric acid by the “Anhydrite Process”, in which cement clinker itself was a by-product. In this process, anhydrite (calcium sulfate) replaces limestone in a cement rawmix, and under reducing conditions, sulfur dioxide is evolved instead of carbon dioxide. The sulfur dioxide is converted to sulfuric acid by the Contact Process using a vanadium pentoxide catalyst.

CaSO4 + 2 C → CaS + 2CO2

3 CaSO4 + CaS + 2 SiO2 → 2 Ca2SiO4 (belite) + 4 SO2

3 CaSO4 + CaS → 4 CaO + 4 SO2

Ca2SiO4 + CaO → Ca3OSiO4 (alite)

2 SO2 + O2 → 2 SO3
(in the presence of the catalyst vanadium pentoxide)

SO3 + H2O → H2SO4 

Because of its use in an expanding niche market, the Whitehaven plant continued to expand in a manner not shared by the other Anhydrite Process plants. The anhydrite mine opened on 11/1/1955, and the acid plant started on 14/11/1955. For a while in the early 1970s, it became the largest sulfuric acid plant in the UK, making about 13% of national production, and it was by far the largest Anhydrite Process plant ever built.

Production and occurrence 
The main sources of calcium sulfate are naturally occurring gypsum and anhydrite, which occur at many locations worldwide as evaporites. These may be extracted by open-cast quarrying or by deep mining. World production of natural gypsum is around 127 million tonnes per annum.

In addition to natural sources, calcium sulfate is produced as a by-product in a number of processes:
In flue-gas desulfurization, exhaust gases from fossil-fuel power stations and other processes (e.g. cement manufacture) are scrubbed to reduce their sulfur oxide content, by injecting finely ground limestone:

Related sulfur-trapping methods use lime and some produces an impure calcium sulfite, which oxidizes on storage to calcium sulfate.
In the production of phosphoric acid from phosphate rock, calcium phosphate is treated with sulfuric acid and calcium sulfate precipitates. The product, called phosphogypsum is often contaminated with impurities making its use uneconomic.
In the production of hydrogen fluoride, calcium fluoride is treated with sulfuric acid, precipitating calcium sulfate.
In the refining of zinc, solutions of zinc sulfate are treated with hydrated lime to co-precipitate heavy metals such as barium.
Calcium sulfate can also be recovered and re-used from scrap drywall at construction sites.

These precipitation processes tend to concentrate radioactive elements in the calcium sulfate product. This issue is particular with the phosphate by-product, since phosphate ores naturally contain uranium and its decay products such as radium-226, lead-210 and polonium-210. Extraction of uranium from phosphorus ores can be economical on its own depending on prices on the uranium market or the separation of uranium can be mandated by environmental legislation and its sale is used to recover part of the cost of the process.

Calcium sulfate is also a common component of fouling deposits in industrial heat exchangers, because its solubility decreases with increasing temperature (see the specific section on the retrograde solubility).

Retrograde solubility
The dissolution of the different crystalline phases of calcium sulfate in water is exothermic and releases heat (decrease in Enthalpy: ΔH < 0). As an immediate consequence, to proceed, the dissolution reaction needs to evacuate this heat that can be considered as a product of reaction. If the system is cooled, the dissolution equilibrium will evolve towards the right according to the Le Chatelier principle and calcium sulfate will dissolve more easily. Thus the solubility of calcium sulfate increases as the temperature decreases and vice versa. If the temperature of the system is raised, the reaction heat cannot dissipate and the equilibrium will regress towards the left according to Le Chatelier principle. The solubility of calcium sulfate decreases as temperature increases. This counter-intuitive solubility behaviour is called retrograde solubility. It is less common than for most of the salts whose dissolution reaction is endothermic (i.e., the reaction consumes heat: increase in Enthalpy: ΔH > 0) and whose solubility increases with temperature. Another calcium compound, calcium hydroxide (Ca(OH)2, portlandite) also exhibits a retrograde solubility for the same thermodynamic reason: because its dissolution reaction is also exothermic and releases heat. So, to dissolve the maximum amount of calcium sulfate or calcium hydroxide in water, it is necessary to cool the solution down close to its freezing point instead of increasing its temperature.

The retrograde solubility of calcium sulfate is also responsible for its precipitation in the hottest zone of heating systems and for its contribution to the formation of scale in boilers along with the precipitation of calcium carbonate whose solubility also decreases when CO2 degasses from hot water or can escape out of the system.

On planet Mars
2011 findings by the Opportunity rover on the planet Mars show a form of calcium sulfate in a vein on the surface. Images suggest the mineral is gypsum.

See also
 Calcium sulfate (data page)
Alabaster
Anhydrite
Bathybius haeckelii
Chalk (calcium carbonate)
Gypsum
Gypsum plaster
Phosphogypsum
Selenite (mineral)
Flue-gas desulfurization

References

External links
International Chemical Safety Card 1215
NIOSH Pocket Guide to Chemical Hazards

Calcium compounds
Sulfates
Desiccants
Food additives
Pyrotechnic colorants
E-number additives